The Thiotrichales are an order of Pseudomonadota, including Thiomargarita magnifica, the largest known bacterium.

They also include certain pathogens, such as Francisella tularensis which causes tularemia (rabbit fever).

References

 
Gammaproteobacteria